The Senate of the Republic, constitutionally Chamber of Senators of the Honorable Congress of the Union, is the upper house of Mexico's bicameral Congress. It currently consists of 128 members, who serve six-year terms.

History 
Bicameral legislature, including the Senate, was established on 4 October 1824. The Senate was abolished on 7 September 1857 and re-established on 13 November 1874. Under the regime of Porfirio Diaz or the Porfiriato, many seats were given to elites and wealthy people loyal to the regime. During the Mexican Revolution, notably during the brief Madero presidency, the senate was left intact with Porfirian sympathizers and blocked the president's attempts to pass reforms for the Revolution.

Composition
After a series of reforms during the 1990s, the Senate is made up of 128 senators:

Two for each of the 32 states elected under the principle of relative majority;
One for each of the 32 states assigned under the principle of first minority (i.e. awarded to the party who had won the second highest number of votes within the state or Mexico City);
Thirty-two national senators-at-large, divided among the parties in proportion to their share of the national vote.

In a senatorial race, each party nominates two candidates who run and are elected together by direct vote. The party of the two candidates that won the second highest vote within the state or Mexico City then assigns a senator to occupy the third seat (first minority seat), according to the list of candidates that the party registered with the Federal Electoral Institute (IFE).

Senators serve six-year terms, running concurrently with the President of Mexico's Sexenio. Special elections are rare, as substitutes are chosen at every election. Until 2018, the Senate was completely renewed every six years since senators were barred from immediate reelection, but Senators can now serve a second term.

The current composition of the Senate is as follows:

Last election

Term
In Spanish, it is conventional to refer to each Legislature of the Senate by the Roman numeral of its term. The current session (whose term lasts from 2018 to 2021) is known as the LXIV Legislatura (64th Legislature).

Senators are elected to serve during two legislatures of the Mexican Chamber of Deputies. Thus, current senators (who were elected in the general election of 1 July 2018) will serve during the 64th and 65th Legislatures of the Chamber of Deputies.

Legislatures
A senator holds office for a period of six years for which he was elected (from September 1 of the year of its election to August 31 six years later), divided into two legislatures of three years each.

From 1 September 2015 is installed LXIII Legislature, which will end its term on August 31, 2018. Senators were elected to office in the 2012 elections for a period of six years and are at their posts from 1 September of that year, therefore they will hold office from the LXII Legislature to LXIII Legislature.

Election of senators

Eligibility requirements

According to the Constitution, senators are the representatives of the nation. To be a senator, for any of the two principles of choice, you must meet the following requirements:
Being a Mexican citizen by birth, in the exercise of their rights.
Be twenty-five years old on election day
Being from the state in the election, or a resident with an effective residence of more than six months prior to the date of the election, or in the case of candidates is made by proportional representation of any of the states that as the constituency, with the same details.
Not being active duty in the military or have control of police or rural gendarmerie at least ninety days before the election.
Not be a secretary or undersecretary of state unless it is definitively separated from office at least ninety days before the election.
Not be Minister of the Supreme Court unless definitively separated from office three years before the election.
Not a minister of some religious cult.

Election process
Senators are elected for a period of six years, corresponding to two legislatures and can be reelected ojos one time for the immediate period.

They are elected by direct popular suffrage and secret ballot in every state of the republic. Each political party registers a list with two formulas of candidates, consisting of two owners and their alternates: the number 1 of the formula First Formula is denominated to him, and 2, Second Formula. The formula of candidates obtaining the highest number of votes is elected complete, becoming the first two senators of the entity; the third Senate seat is awarded to the candidate of First Formula of the political party that won second place of votes or first minority.

There are also 32 senators elected by proportional representation. For this election, each political party registers a list of 32 candidates, and these are allocated by proportional representation according to the number of votes obtained by each political party in the national election.

Governing bodies
For their internal government has two main instances, namely:
Board: Composed of a Chairman, three Vice-Chairpersons and four Secretaries, elected for each regular session of the House, the chairman is the President of the Senate and is the head and representative of the Chamber.
Political Coordination Board: Considered the true governing body of the Chamber consists of a chairman and six members, which always include the Coordinators of the different parliamentary factions of political parties represented in the Senate.

Commissions
For the office of legislative affairs, senators integrate into commissions that are dedicated to a particular issue. The most important committees are those of interior, constitutional issues, defense, finance, and justice. Each senator belongs to at least three different commissions, and each committee elects a chairman and two to five secretaries (according to the commission) to coordinate their work.

Sessions
The two chambers of the General Congress divided its exercise into two ordinary sessions, the first from 1 September to 15 December and the second from 1 February to 30 April, it should be required may convene special sessions to dispatch urgent or pertinent matters.

The time between the regular sessions known as Recesses. There are two recesses that run from 16 December to 31 January and 1 May to 31 August. During breaks, the Permanent Commission of the Congress is installed and serves as the depository of the legislature; It is composed of 37 members, of which 19 deputies and 18 senators are appointed by their respective chambers the day before the closing of the regular sessions.

The sessions of the Standing Committee are held in the Senate during the first recess and the House of Representatives in the second recess.

Functions
Among the most important functions of the Senate it is to ratify or reject the president's proposals regarding:
Ministers of the Supreme Court of Justice of the Nation
Attorney General of the Republic
Heads of Autonomous Bodies
Diplomatic Representatives (Ambassadors and Consuls)
International deals

Gallery

References

Footnotes

External links
 Official Website of the Mexican Senate

1824 establishments in Mexico
1874 establishments in Mexico
Congress of the Union
Mexico
Landmarks in Mexico City
Buildings and structures in Mexico City
History of Mexico
State archives
20th century in Mexico
Architecture in Mexico